Alexei Vladimirovich Krutov (born February 1, 1984) is a Russian former professional ice hockey winger. He most recently played for HC Red Ice in the National League B during the 2016-17 NLB season. He is the son of Vladimir Krutov (1960–2012), who represented the Soviet Union in the 1980s.

Career
While playing for ZSC Lions, Krutov won the 2008–09 Champions Hockey League and the 2008 National League A. He later returned to Switzerland to join Genève-Servette HC to end the 2013–14 season.

On July 11, 2014, Krutov signalled his return to his native Russia in accepting a try-out with expansion club, HC Sochi. On August 28, 2014, he was successful in signing a one-year contract for Sochi's inaugural season in 2014–15.

References

External links

1984 births
Living people
Avtomobilist Yekaterinburg players
Genève-Servette HC players
HC CSKA Moscow players
HC Neftekhimik Nizhnekamsk players
HC Red Ice players
HC Sochi players
HC Spartak Moscow players
Krylya Sovetov Moscow players
Metallurg Novokuznetsk players
Russian ice hockey left wingers
Severstal Cherepovets players
Ice hockey people from Moscow
ZSC Lions players
Russian expatriate ice hockey people
Russian expatriate sportspeople in Switzerland
Expatriate ice hockey players in Switzerland